Giovanni Battista Amendola (1848–1887) was an Italian sculptor from Sarno.

Life 
He studied in Naples at the Academy of Fine Arts.  Much of his work is to be seen in Naples, including a statue of Joachim Murat for the façade of the Royal Palace, a bust of architect Enrico Alvino in the grounds of the Villa Comunale.  In Salerno his Pergolesi Dying can be seen at the opera house. He also sculpted the caryatids at the entrance of the Mausoleo Schilizzi in Posillipo.

He moved to England, receiving commissions both there and from abroad, with the latter including the well-known bronze of a pensive woman entitled The Dominant Thought, and Wedded (a 21"-high bronze of a young couple).  He also produced a seated statuette of Laura Theresa Alma-Tadema.

Sources 
 Eight Statues, Eight Sculptors

1848 births
1887 deaths
People from the Province of Salerno
Accademia di Belle Arti di Napoli alumni
19th-century Italian sculptors
Italian male sculptors
19th-century Italian male artists